Zurab Lavrentievich Sotkilava (12 March 1937 – 18 September 2017) was a Georgian operatic tenor and People's Artist of the USSR recipient.

Biography

Education
In 1960, Sotkilava graduated from the Tbilisi State Polytechnical Institute.

Football career
Sotkilava began playing association football during childhood. At age 16, he joined Dynamo Sukhumi where he played full-back. In 1956 he became captain of the Georgia national team, and two years later he joined Dynamo Tbilisi. In 1958 he incurred severe injuries while playing in Yugoslavia. This ultimately led to the end of his sports career in Czechoslovakia the following year.

Music career
In 1965 he graduated from the Tbilisi Conservatory under the guidance of David Andguladze. Between 1965 and 1974 Sotkilava was a soloist of the Tbilisi Opera and Ballet Theatre (named after Zakaria Paliashvili). From 1966 to 1968 he was a student at La Scala where his teacher was Dinaro Barra. He later became a teacher at the Moscow Conservatory where he remained until 1988. After six years he became chairman of the International Tchaikovsky Competition and was a member of the Bologna Academy of Music, at which point he became known for his singing of Giuseppe Verdi's works.

By 2000, he chaired the jury at the Kinoshok film festival at Anapa, which hosted films from throughout the CIS and Baltic States.

Later life and death
In 2015, he was diagnosed with a malignant pancreatic tumor; he died in 2017, at age 80, and was survived by his wife, Eliso Turmanidze, and his two daughters.

Roles at the Bolshoi Theatre
Il trovatore — Manrico 
Tosca – Cavaradossi
Iolanta – Vaudemont
Aida – Radames
Sadko – Indian merchant
The Abduction of the Moon – Arzakan
Un ballo in maschera – Riccardo
Cavalleria rusticana – Turiddu
 — Don Caloandro
Boris Godunov – The pretender
Khovanshchina – Galitzine
Nabucco – Ismaele

Awards
 2nd prize International Tchaikovsky Competition (1970)
 Honored Artist of the Georgian SSR (1970)
People's Artist of the Georgian SSR (1973)
People's Artist of the USSR (1979)
 Shota Rustaveli Prize (1993)
 Order "For Merit to the Fatherland", 3rd class (2007)
 Order "For Merit to the Fatherland", 4th class (2001)
 Order of the Badge of Honour (1971)
 Order of the Red Banner of Labour (1976)
Order of Honor (Georgia, 1997)
 Ovation (2008)
Russian Federation Presidential Certificate of Honour (2012) 
Honorary member of the Academy of Music Bologna (Italy) - elected "for a brilliant interpretation of the works of Verdi"
Academician of the Academy of aesthetics and Liberal Arts (Moscow)

Former Students 
 Ksenia Leonidova

References

External links
Interview with Zurab Sotkilava ; accessed 19 September 2017.

1937 births
2017 deaths
People from Sukhumi
Academic staff of Moscow Conservatory
Soviet male opera singers
20th-century Russian male opera singers
20th-century male opera singers from Georgia (country)
Russian music educators
Soviet music educators
Recipients of the Order "For Merit to the Fatherland", 3rd class
People's Artists of the USSR
Soviet footballers
FC Dinamo Tbilisi players
Tbilisi State Conservatoire alumni
Soviet tenors
Russian tenors
Prize-winners of the International Tchaikovsky Competition
Deaths from pancreatic cancer
Deaths from cancer in Russia
Association football defenders
Burials in Georgia (country)
21st-century male opera singers from Georgia (country)